Jacob Bitzer (January 16, 1865 – February 19, 1946) was an American businessman, real estate agent, and politician who served as a member of the Massachusetts House of Representatives.

Early life
Bitzer was born to John and Dorothea (Beck) Bitzer on January 16, 1865, in Dürrwangen, Kingdom of Württemberg.

Education
Bitzer attended the Cutter School in Arlington, Massachusetts, graduating in 1879.

Business career
After he graduated from the Cutter School, Bitzer started a six-year apprentice working for the Welch & Griffiths saw works in Arlington. At the end of his apprenticeship the company went out of business.  After he left the employ of Welch & Griffiths Bitzer went to work as a mill hand, on an irregular moulding machine, in the mill of Theodore Schwamb, a manufacturer of piano cases.

In 1897, when the Schwamb Mill was incorporated, Bitzer became a stockholder, and clerk of the corporation. In 1908 Bitzer was the assistant superintendent of the mill in charge of the mill department.

Republican National Convention
Bitzer was an alternative delegate to the Republican National Convention of 1912.

Massachusetts House of Representatives
On November 3, 1914, Bitzer was elected a member of the Massachusetts House of Representatives representing the twenty seventh Middlesex District, Bitzer received 1,372 in a three way race that included fellow Arlington Resident Cyrus Edwin Dallin; James F. McCarthy of Lexington, Massachusetts.
Bitzer served in the legislature from 1915 to 1919.    During the 1917 legislative session Bitzer was a member of the Committee on Public Institutions, and the Committee on Ways and Means.

See also
 1915 Massachusetts legislature
 1916 Massachusetts legislature
 1917 Massachusetts legislature
 1918 Massachusetts legislature
 1919 Massachusetts legislature

References

 

Businesspeople from Massachusetts
Republican Party members of the Massachusetts House of Representatives
People from Arlington, Massachusetts
1865 births
1946 deaths